Miha Likar (24 July 1923 – 3 May 2010) was a Slovene doctor, specialist in microbiology and parasitology.

Likar was born in Ljubljana in 1923 and studied medicine at the University of Ljubljana where he later worked. He died in 2010. He was author of the internationally successful book Family Health: An Illustrated Guide (published 1980 ) (Slovene title:  Zdravje v družini) and a number of other lay books on health and related matters. He won the Levstik Award in 1962 for Virusi, Bakterije in Glivice (Viruses, Bacteria and Fungi).

References 

1923 births
2010 deaths
Slovenian parasitologists
Levstik Award laureates
University of Ljubljana alumni
People from Ljubljana in health professions
Yugoslav scientists